Khambi is a village in Palwal District in the State of Haryana, India. It is 24 km from Palwal and 11 km from Hodal. The Delhi Agra canal flows near the village and the Yamuna river is 8 km east of the village.

History 
Khambi village has a great history and it is said that this village has existed since Dvapara Yuga(era of Lord Krishna). The "khamb" (a big stone pillar) which was put by Lord Balarama is at the center of the village and due to this fact, the village is named as Khambi. This village lies in Brijmandal and it is said that Lord Krishna had visited the village. Khambi also contains a temple of Baba Mathura Das.

Description 
Khambi is a populous Hindu village. There are many farmers in the village. The village lies amidst fields. Local temples include Ram mandir, Baba Mathura Das mandir, Baba Kriparam, Khera Devta, Bengali Baba Ka mandir, and Seengan Wala Baba Ka mandir.

Famous people 

 Devi Chitralekha - sanatan dharma parcharak
 Pandit Totaram Brijwasi- Popular singer and songwriter
 Gopal Sharma - Doctor and sevak of the village.
 Baba Mathura Das
 Pandit Tikaram Sharma was a renowned and famous personality of the village. He was a teacher in the village school and also an RMP Doctor. He was elected as the Sarpanch of the village continuously for 23 years and was two times Block Chairman of the Hodal Block. He constructed the government high school in Khambi with donation and contribution from village people.
Late Pandit Ghosi Ram Bohre was one of the topmost landlords in agricultural land holding belonged to  Khambi from Panch Bishwa mohalla.  He built Haveli and Nohra around 1947. He was very much social and religious minded personality.  He always helped poor and marginal farmers. He built a dharamshala in his agricultural land adjoining Khambi Hassanpur Road, near Agra Canal which is named as Ghosi Bohre waali dharamshala. This dharamshala is currently used by religious tourists performing the 84 kos Brij parikrama.
Chetan Kaushik
Swami Ramchandi, a famous musician who lived in Agra and Delhi. He was famous for Sashtriya Sangeet(classical music).
 prashant sharma- pathologist

References

Villages in Palwal district